Samantha Mills (born 23 March 1992) is an Australian diver.

Mills was a gymnast through her childhood and early teens, briefly turned to pole vaulting before switching to diving. At the 2013 Summer Universiade, she won the gold medal in the Women's 1m and teamed with Esther Qin to win the silver medal in the Women's 3m Synchronized. In December 2014, she won the Women's 3m at the Australian Diving Championships.

At the 2015 World Aquatics Championships in Kazan, Russia, she won a bronze medal in the Women's 3m Synchronised with Esther Qin.

In 2015, she is a South Australian Institute of Sport scholarship holder and coached by Michel Larouche.

References 

Australian female divers
Living people
World Aquatics Championships medalists in diving
Universiade medalists in diving
1992 births
Universiade gold medalists for Australia
Universiade silver medalists for Australia
Medalists at the 2013 Summer Universiade
South Australian Sports Institute alumni
20th-century Australian women
21st-century Australian women